Tiyas (also known as al-Safa ) is a village in central Syria, administratively part of the Homs Governorate, east of Homs. It is situated in the Syrian Desert, and the closest localities are Tadmur (Palmyra) to the east, the subdistrict center of al-Qaryatayn to the southwest, Furqlus to the west and Uqayribat to the northwest. According to the Central Bureau of Statistics (CBS), Tiyas had a population of 2,564 in the 2004 census.

Tiyas is also near the Syrian Air Force base of the same name which lies just to the southwest. During the 1970s and 1980s, the Soviet Union was given access to the Tiyas Military Airbase for the periodical deployment of naval aircraft. The base at Tiyas was also used to patrol the United States' naval fleet in the Eastern Mediterranean Sea.

References

Bibliography

Populated places in Homs District